Khachrod is a town and municipality in Ujjain district in the Indian state of Madhya Pradesh.

Geography
It sits at an elevation of 485 metres (1591 feet).

References

Cities and towns in Ujjain district